"Banzai" is the thirty-sixth single by B'z, released on May 5, 2004. This song is one of B'z many number-one singles in Oricon charts.

Track listing 
Banzai
Magnolia

Certifications

References 
B'z performance at Oricon

External links 
 

2004 singles
B'z songs
Oricon Weekly number-one singles
Songs written by Tak Matsumoto
Songs written by Koshi Inaba
2004 songs